Lieutenant-General John Cutts, 1st Baron Cutts, PC (Ire) (1661 – 25 January 1707), was a British soldier and author.

Early life
Cutts was born about 1661 at Woodhall, Arkesden, Essex, the second son of Richard Cutte or Cuttes and Joan Everard (daughter of Sir Richard Everard). The family were descended from Sir John Cutts, who had been Treasurer of the Household to Henry VIII.
After a short university career at  Catharine Hall, Cambridge, he inherited the family estates, but showed a distinct preference for the life of court and camp.

Career
The double ambition for military and literary fame inspired his first work, which appeared in 1685 under the name La Muse de cavalier, or An Apology for such Gentlemen as make Poetry their Diversion not their Business. The next year saw Cutts serving as a volunteer under the Duke of Lorraine in Hungary, and it is said that he was the first to plant the imperial standard on the walls at the storming of Buda (July 1686). In 1687 he published a book of Poetical Exercises. The following year he was serving as lieutenant-colonel in Holland. General Hugh Mackay described Cutts about this time as "pretty tall, lusty and well shaped, an agreeable companion with abundance of wit, affable and familiar, but too much seized with vanity and self-conceit".

Lieutenant-Colonel Cutts was one of  William III's companions in the English  Revolution of 1688, and in 1690 he went in command of a regiment of foot in Ireland, where he served with distinction. He served with distinction at the Battle of the Boyne (July 1690), and at the siege of Limerick (1690) (where he was wounded), and King William created him Baron Cutts, of Gowran, in the Peerage of Ireland, on 12 December 1690. In 1691 he succeeded to the command of the brigade of the prince of Hesse (wounded at  Aughrim in July 1691), and on the surrender of Limerick was appointed commandant of the town. In the following year he served again in Flanders as a brigadier. His brigade of Mackay's division had been almost destroyed at Steinkirk in August 1692. At this battle Cutts himself was wounded.

For some time after this, Lord Cutts was lieutenant-governor of the Isle of Wight (in office: 1694-1707), but he returned to active service in 1694, holding a command in the disastrous  Brest expedition of June 1694. He was one of  Carmarthen's companions in the daring reconnaissance of Camaret Bay, and was soon afterwards again wounded. As colonel of the Coldstream Guards Cutts succeeded Talmash, commander of the expedition, who died of his wounds. He served as a commissioner for settling the bank of Antwerp in the following year, distinguishing himself again at the famous Siege of Namur (1695), winning the name "Salamander" by his indifference to the heaviest fire. Though shot in the head while leading an attack against the citadel, he recovered to lead his men to the capture of the works. Thereafter court service and war service alternated.

Cutts was deep in the confidence of William III, and acted as a diplomatic agent in the negotiations which ended in the Peace of Ryswick of 1697. On the occasion of the great fire in Whitehall (1698) Cutts, at the head of the Coldstreamers, earned afresh the honourable nickname of "the Salamander". Later Captain Richard Steele worked as his private secretary. In 1702, as a major-general, Cutts served under  Marlborough in the opening campaign of the War of the Spanish Succession of 1701-1714, and at the 1702 siege of Venlo, conspicuous as usual for romantic bravery, he led the stormers at Fort Saint Michael. His enemies, and even the survivors of the assault, were amazed at the success of a seemingly hare-brained enterprise. Probably, however, Cutts, who was now a veteran of great and varied experience, measured the factors of success and failure better than his critics. On this occasion   Swift lampooned the lieutenant-general in his Ode to a Salamander. Cutts made the campaign of 1703 in Flanders, and in 1704, after a visit to England, he rejoined Marlborough on the banks of the Danube. At  Blenheim (August 1704) he was third in command, and it was his division that. bore the brunt of the desperate fighting at the village which gave its name to the battle. Blenheim was Cutts's last battle. On 23 March 1705 he was appointed Commander-in-Chief, Ireland, his last appointment. He retained formal command of the Irish army until his death.

Later years
His remaining years were spent at home, and, at the time of his death, he was the holder of eight distinct political and military offices. He sat in five parliaments for the county of Cambridge, and in Queen Anne's first Parliament he was returned for Newport in the Isle of Wight, for which he sat until the time of his death. He was twice married, but left no issue.

Cutts' old Cambridge college, St Catharine's, organised a dinner to commemorate the tercentenary of his death, held in January 2007.

References

 

|-

1661 births
1707 deaths
Alumni of St Catharine's College, Cambridge
Barons in the Peerage of Ireland
Peers of Ireland created by William III
British army commanders in the War of the Spanish Succession
Coldstream Guards officers
English generals
Members of the Privy Council of Ireland
Williamite military personnel of the Williamite War in Ireland
English MPs 1690–1695
English MPs 1695–1698
English MPs 1698–1700
English MPs 1701
English MPs 1701–1702
English MPs 1702–1705
English MPs 1705–1707
English male poets
Members of Parliament for the Isle of Wight